Dmytro Vitaliyovych Chumak (born 11 July 1990) is a Ukrainian weightlifting medalist who competes in the 102 kg weight division. He won a bronze medal at the 2015 World Championships and placed sixth at the 2016 Olympics.

Major results

References

External links

 
 
 
 
 

1990 births
Living people
Ukrainian male weightlifters
Olympic weightlifters of Ukraine
Weightlifters at the 2016 Summer Olympics
World Weightlifting Championships medalists
People from Skadovsk
European Weightlifting Championships medalists
Sportspeople from Kherson Oblast
20th-century Ukrainian people
21st-century Ukrainian people